Vanya Shtereva is a popular Bulgarian singer and writer. She's known for her eccentric attitude and image. She has written songs for a lot of Bulgarian artists such as Stenli, Antibiotika, Aksiniya, etc.
Her first, and to date only, album is called "In Vitro" and was released in 2003. It gained little success due to poor promotion. Today, Vanya is the vocalist of the group MatchPoint. They released their first single in July 2007 charting #1 on MAD TV Bulgaria Top 10.
Her first book "Obraztsov dom" was published in 2005 and since then has become one of the best selling books in Bulgaria by a contemporary author. Her daughter is the bulgarian singer Mila Robert.

Albums
 In Vitro (2003)

Singles
 Дъждът
 Портокалово момиче
 Ин витро
 Ще те купя
 Образцов дом

References

1970 births
Living people
21st-century Bulgarian women singers
Bulgarian songwriters
Writers from Varna, Bulgaria
Bulgarian actresses
Bulgarian pop singers
Big Brother (Bulgarian TV series) contestants
Musicians from Varna, Bulgaria